The Custard Boys is a 1960 British  novel by John Rae, focusing on the lives of children in a small village in World War II Norfolk dealing with an influx of war refugees. It is sometimes compared to Lord of the Flies, and was adapted to make  the film Reach for Glory in 1962 (which was passed with an 'X' certificate at the time by the British Board of Film Censors), and again for a second film carrying the original name in 1979, directed by Colin Finbow.

References

Novels set in Norfolk
Novels set during World War II
1960 British novels
British novels adapted into films
Rupert Hart-Davis books